is the fifth single by Shiori Takei and released August 10, 2005 under Giza Studio label. Her second album, Second tune had this title as part of the name of the album. The single reached #27th in the first week. It charted for 6 weeks and sold over 13,820 copies. This is the most successful song during her career.

Track listing

Usage in media 
The song, "Sekai Tomete" was used as ending theme for anime Detective Conan

References 

2005 singles
2005 songs
Being Inc. singles
Giza Studio singles
Songs written by Aika Ohno